Vincent Nsengiyumva (February 10, 1936 – June 7, 1994) was a Rwandan prelate of the Roman Catholic Church who served as Archbishop of Kigali from 1976 until his death.

Born in Rwaza, he was ordained to the priesthood on June 18, 1966.

On December 17, 1973, Nsengiyumva was appointed Bishop of Nyundo by Pope Paul VI, replacing Aloys Bigirumwami, who had resigned. He received his episcopal consecration on June 2, 1974, from Cardinal Laurean Rugambwa, with Bishop Aloys Bigirumwami and Archbishop André Perraudin, MAfr, serving as co-consecrators. He was later named the first Archbishop of Kigali on April 10, 1976.

Within the Rwandan government, Nsengiyumva served as chairman of the central committee of the National Republican Movement for Democracy and Development for fourteen years, until the Vatican Curia intervened in 1990, ordering him to withdraw from further political involvement. The National Republican Movement for Democracy and Development was the Hutu-dominated ruling party in Rwanda between 1975 and 1994.

Nsengiyumva was a personal friend of then Rwandan President Juvenal Habyarimana, whose portrait pin he wore while saying Mass.

On June 7, 1994, at the age of 58, he was murdered near the Kabgayi church center with two bishops, ten priests, and a child, by soldiers of the Tutsi-dominated Rwandan Patriotic Front. The RPF claimed that the soldiers believed that the prelates were involved with the killing of their families.

References

External links
Catholic-Hierarchy
Anglican Complicity in the Genocide in Rwanda And Lessons for the Anglican Communion Today

1936 births
1994 deaths
People from Musanze District
Hutu people
Rwandan Roman Catholic archbishops
People who died in the Rwandan genocide
Rwandan murder victims
20th-century Roman Catholic archbishops in Africa
Rwandan Roman Catholic bishops
Roman Catholic bishops of Nyundo
Roman Catholic archbishops of Kigali